Sir Herbert Angas Parsons, KBE, KC (23 May 1872 – 2 November 1945), generally known as Sir Angas Parsons, was a Cornish Australian lawyer, politician and judge.

Early life and education
Parsons was born in North Adelaide on 23 May 1872, the only son of Cornish born minister and politician John Langdon Parsons (1837–1903) and his first wife Rose.

He was educated at Prince Alfred College and Roseworthy Agricultural College before spending three years following "pastoral and financial pursuits". He then studied law at the University of Adelaide, serving his articles with George Ash and graduating in March 1897, aged 24.

Career
He was admitted to the Bar later in 1897. He joined with Patrick McMahon Glynn, KC. in partnership in 1898; they were joined in October 1908 by George McEwin and subsequently by (later Sir) Mellis Napier.

In 1912 he stood for parliament and was elected member of the South Australian House of Assembly for Torrens (1912-1915), and subsequently member for Murray. It was around June of this year that he became universally referred to as "Angas Parsons".
He was briefly Attorney-General of South Australia and minister of education in 1915. Parsons was appointed King's Counsel in 1916, a judge of the Supreme Court in 1921, senior puisne judge in 1927, and acting chief justice in 1935. On occasions, Parsons acted as deputy governor and, after his father's death, in 1904 he became consul for Japan.

Service and recognition
Like his father-in-law, he became president of the Cornish Association of South Australia. He was also warden of the University of Adelaide's senate, and vice-chancellor from 1942 to 1944.

He was knighted in 1936, and appointed Knight Commander of the Order of the British Empire (KBE) in 1945. He retired in 1945 and, having "spent many hours at the Adelaide Club, preferring its convivial atmosphere to his wife's Methodism".

Personal life
On 18 April 1900, Parsons married Mary Elsie Bonython (1874–1956), eldest surviving child of Sir John Langdon Bonython and his wife Mary Louisa Fredericka née Balthasar. They had two sons.

Mary Elsie Parsons served with distinction as Mayoress at official functions for her widowed brother Sir John Lavington Bonython in 1911 and 1912.

Parsons died of cirrhosis on 2 November 1945. Survived by Lady Parsons and their two sons Philip Brendon Angas Parsons (1905– ) and Geoffrey Bonython Parsons (1908– ), he was buried with his parents in North Road Cemetery.

Gallery

References

 

1872 births
1945 deaths
Australian Knights Bachelor
Australian Knights Commander of the Order of the British Empire
Australian politicians awarded knighthoods
Attorneys-General of South Australia
Members of the South Australian House of Assembly
Judges of the Supreme Court of South Australia
20th-century Australian judges
Australian King's Counsel
Lawyers from Adelaide
Vice-Chancellors of the University of Adelaide
Australian people of Cornish descent
Bonython family
People educated at Prince Alfred College
Adelaide Law School alumni
Adelaide Club
Deaths from cirrhosis
Burials at North Road Cemetery